Jamie Murray and André Sá were the defending champions, but lost in the first round to Xavier Malisse and Alexander Waske.
Nicolas Mahut and Édouard Roger-Vasselin defeated Johan Brunström and Frederik Nielsen in the final, 7–6(7–3), 6–4. It was Mahut and Roger-Vasselin's third ATP World Tour doubles title of the year.

Seeds

Draw

Draw

References
 Main Draw

Doubles